Nauheim is a municipality in Groß-Gerau district in Hesse, Germany.
Nauheim is located southwest of Frankfurt am Main and is part of the metropolitan region of Frankfurt. It lies in the Hessian Ried.

Geography

Location 
Nauheim lies 3 km northwest of the district seat of Groß-Gerau 16 km northwest of Darmstadt and 6 km southeast of Rüsselsheim. After the Second World War, many instrument makers from the Sudetenland such as W. Schreiber + Söhne found a new home in this community in the southern Frankfurt Rhein-Main Region, and helped give the place the epithet Musikgemeinde – "Music Community". It is also well known for its "Nauheimer Musiktage" ("Nauheim Music Days"), held since 1970.

Neighbouring communities 
Nauheim borders in the north on Königstädten, a constituent community of the town of Rüsselsheim, in the east on the town of Mörfelden-Walldorf, in the south on the town of Groß-Gerau and in the west on the community of Trebur.

History 
 Nauheim had its first documentary mention in 830-850 in the Lorsch codex.

Manufacture of Saxophones 

Schreiber & Keilwerth Musikinstrumente GmbH, a firm manufacturing saxophones are based in Nauheim as of 2010.

Additionally, another saxophone manufacturer called Dörfler & Jörka was located in Nauheim between 1949 to 1968. D&J had a close and complicated relationship with Keilwerth. D&J were originally employed as subcontractors for Keilwerth, making saxophone bodies and other component parts, then sending them back to the nearby Keilwerth factory for final assembly. Eventually, D&J started to manufacture their own complete saxophones (without any Keilwerth involvement) before supplying them directly to German musical instrument retailers as well as the export market. Saxophones manufactured by Dörfler & Jörka for distribution direct to retailers featured their own key mechanisms which were very closely modelled on Keilwerth designs, though not completely identical. It is important to note that D&J saxophones are not Keilwerth "stencils", but rather are nearly identical copies of Keilwerths from the same era e.g. they have rolled tone holes and are high quality, professional-grade instruments. As a result the tonal characteristics of Dörfler & Jörka saxophones are very similar to Keilwerth instruments and share the distinctive Keilwerth sound i.e. have the same "dark", "smoky", "punchy" and "woody" Keilwerth tone colours, compared to the "brighter" and more neutral sound of, say, Yamaha saxophones. Not surprisingly, it can be very difficult to distinguish the sound of D&J instruments from Keilwerth-manufactured saxophones dating from the same time period e.g. the Keilwerth 'New King' and 'Tone King' models.

D&J manufactured alto and tenor saxophones exclusively. There is no evidence of soprano or baritone saxophones ever being produced by them. Unusually for a saxophone manufacturer, Dörfler & Jörka rarely had their own name engraved on their instruments. The majority of D&J saxophones were engraved with numerous different labels including (but not limited to) the following:-

Artist #300
Boucet
Carl Ludwig, Carl Schiller, Clinton, Condor, Convair
De Villiers, De Villier, Diamond
Gebr. Alexander Mainz
Henri Bouchet, H.Genet 
Impala
Jubilee
Key Tone, King Tempo
La Sete Professional
Marcel-Doriot
National
Original Hopf Classic
Paragon, Pierre Maure Artiste
Ravoy, Rene Dumont, Rodgers, Roxy
Senator, Startone, Skymaster, Skytone, Symphonic
The National, Toneline Artist
US Bandmaster
Velvetone, Vitacoustic, Voss
Warner Concerto

Due to issues of intellectual property infringement, brand recognition and consequential loss of revenue, the Keilwerth company became increasingly aggrieved that Dörfler & Jörka were successfully copying their saxophones, which was amplified by the fact that both companies were based in the same town and had previously enjoyed a mutually beneficial business relationship. Around 1965 the Keilwerth company sued D&J and won their case. Dörfler & Jörka were subsequently absorbed into the Keilwerth company and production of all D&J saxophones ended by 1968.

Politics

Municipal council 
Municipal council is made up of 31 councillors, with seats apportioned thus, in accordance with municipal elections held on 6 March 2016:
CDU 9 seats
SPD 10 seats
Greens 5 seats
FDP 3 seats
FLN 4 seats
Note: FLN is a citizens' coalition.

Partnerships 
  Born, Netherlands, since 1972
  Charvieu-Chavagneux, France, since 1978

Culture and sightseeing 
The local history museum (Heimatmuseum) shows farming traditions, handicraft history, an Erzgebirge Parlour and a musical instrument department with nearly 200 instruments from various periods.

Personalities 
Karl Christian von Langsdorf (1757–1834), mathematician
 Ottmar Hörl (1950-    ), artist, who above all has become known for his variegated sculptures whose theme is everyday life

Clubs and associations 
 Free religious Community of Nauheim
 Nauheim volunteer fire brigade
 Nauheim youth fire brigade
 Musikverein 1950 e.V. Nauheim
 Naumer Kerweborsch Nauheim church fair organizers
 Vereinsring Nauheim
 Junge Musiker - SKV Nauheim

References

External links 
 Nauheim
 Nauheim local history museum (Heimatmuseum)

 Nauheim - innovative Art

Groß-Gerau (district)